Yu Dawei (born 1984-06-21 in Qingdao, Shandong) is a male Chinese volleyball player. He was part of the silver medal winning team at the 2006 Asian Games.

He competed for Team China at the 2008 Summer Olympics in Beijing.

References
Profile on Olympic.cn

1984 births
Living people
Olympic volleyball players of China
Volleyball players from Qingdao
Volleyball players at the 2008 Summer Olympics
Asian Games medalists in volleyball
Volleyball players at the 2006 Asian Games
Chinese men's volleyball players
Medalists at the 2006 Asian Games
Asian Games silver medalists for Japan
21st-century Chinese people